The 2008 ICF World Junior Canoe Slalom Championships were the 12th edition of the ICF World Junior Canoe Slalom Championships. The event took place in Roudnice nad Labem, Czech Republic from 25 to 27 July 2008 under the auspices of the International Canoe Federation (ICF).

Medal summary

Men

Canoe

Kayak

Women

Kayak

Medal table

References

External links
International Canoe Federation

ICF World Junior Canoe Slalom Championships
ICF World Junior and U23 Canoe Slalom Championships